Normal West High School is a public high school in Normal, Illinois.   The mascot is the wildcat and school colors are black and silver.   The school opened in 1995 and its current student body numbers roughly 1,600.

Extracurricular activities

Sports

Soccer
In the school's short existence, the girls soccer team has won four Big Twelve Conference titles, along with two IHSA State Tournament qualifications, and a third place finish at the IHSA State Tournament in 2008, a second place finish at the IHSA State Tournament in 2014, and a fourth place finish at the IHSA tournament in 2018.

Band
The Normal Community West Marching Band has had many achievements including, qualifying for the semifinals at Bands of America Grand Nationals in 1997, qualifying for Finals at the 1999 St. Louis Regional, appearing in the Fiesta Bowl parade in 2002, 2008, and 2012, winning their division in 2002 and placing 5th in Finals at the Field Competition in 2008. In 2008, the Normal Community West Marching Band won their division in the State of Illinois Invitational Marching Band Festival, the de facto state championship.

Demographics 
According to the Illinois State Board of Education Report Card, 70.9% of the student population in 2021 was Caucasian, 12.5% was black, 7.9% was non-white Hispanic, 2.6% was Asian, 0.4% was Indigenous, and 0.1% was Pacific Islander. The gender makeup of the school was 51.1% male and 48.9% female. Approximately 30.8% of students were low income, and 19.1% had a disability.  The Report Card also reported that 0.4% of students were homeless.

Notable alumni

Adam Kinzinger (class of 1996), Republican U.S. Representative for Illinois's 11th congressional district.
Cody White (class of 2007), Houston Texans NFL player
Brock Stewart (class of 2010), Los Angeles Dodgers MLB player

References

Public high schools in Illinois
Schools in Bloomington–Normal
Educational institutions established in 1995
1995 establishments in Illinois